High Wycombe railway station is a railway station in the town of High Wycombe, Buckinghamshire, England. It is served by Chiltern Railways.

History

The original terminus station was built in 1854 after an original design by Isambard Kingdom Brunel.

The station had one platform and a train shed that covered two broad gauge tracks. On one side of the train shed was a single road engine shed and on the platform side were a booking office and waiting rooms (on the Birdcage Walk side). The walls of the train shed, an engine shed and offices were constructed from brick and knapped flint with slate roofs. This building remained as a station in use until 1864 when it became a goods shed. Between the 1880s and 1940 various additions were made to the fabric of the old station. The building received grade two listing in 1999 due to being one of only six remaining GWR train sheds. Following listing most of the later additions were removed, restoring the building to its original footprint, the only addition being the flat roof second floor extension added in 1940.

A second through station was opened on the current location in 1864 with a second platform and, later, a footbridge. For two years prior to this date, after the extension to Thame had been made, all through trains had to reverse in and out of the old station which was not located on the new through lines. The design of the office accommodation on the newer station was a copy of the office accommodation on the old, with a canopy covering the platform rather than the train shed. The building was extended as least once at its west end.

With the building of the Great Western and Great Central Joint Railway in 1906 the station was again rebuilt to the design that is in use today, with four lines between two staggered platforms and a subway.

In 1906 the Great Western and Great Central Joint Railway line was opened through High Wycombe, linking London with the two companies' lines to the north. Much of the current Chiltern Main Line is formed from this joint line.

British Rail closed the original branch line to Maidenhead on 2 May 1970 and subsequently the track was lifted.

The station was transferred from the Western Region of British Rail to the London Midland Region on 24 March 1974.

In November 2005 a fire in the ticket office gutted the roof of the building. The restored station building reopened in September 2007.

In April 2015 the Northbound platform was lengthened.  The subway was closed and has now been replaced with a footbridge with a lift at each end.

Services

All trains are operated by Chiltern Railways. The current off-peak services are:

5 trains per hour to London Marylebone, of which:
2 are non-stop to London Marylebone
2 semi-fast calling at Beaconsfield and Gerrards Cross.
1 local calling at Beaconsfield and Gerrards Cross as well as other intermediate stations, which originates at High Wycombe.

High Wycombe has a bay platform, Platform 1, from which additional peak-hour local services run to and from London Marylebone. It is also used by a terminating weekdays only parliamentary service from West Ealing via the Greenford line. Until December 2018 it operated from London Paddington via the Acton-Northolt line.

Future
High Wycombe is to gain further rail links north of Aylesbury to Winslow and Milton Keynes by 2030 as part of the East West Rail project.

References

External links

 Chiltern Railways
 Chiltern Railways Evergreen 3 - Proposed services to Oxford.
Drawings of how the station looked when built

Former Great Western and Great Central Joint Railway stations
Railway stations in Buckinghamshire
DfT Category C1 stations
Railway stations in Great Britain opened in 1854
High Wycombe
Railway stations served by Chiltern Railways